Maximiliano Pighin (born 7 July 1985) was an Argentine footballer. The most part of his career is distributed between Unión San Felipe and Luján.

External links
 
 

1985 births
Living people
Argentine footballers
Argentine expatriate footballers
Unión San Felipe footballers
Primera B de Chile players
Expatriate footballers in Chile
Association football midfielders